Mexican Girl Dying is a marble sculpture carved in 1848 by American artist Thomas Crawford. It measures   x  x  and is part of the Metropolitan Museum of Art's collection. The woman's identity is not known, but the artist has stated that he drew influence from William H. Prescott 1843 History of the Conquest of Mexico. She bears a wound below her right breast, suggesting that she has been in battle. The cross beside her suggests martyrdom.

References

1848 sculptures
Death in art
Marble sculptures in New York City
Sculptures of the Metropolitan Museum of Art
Sculptures of women in New York City
Statues in New York City